Fall prevention includes any action taken to help reduce the number of accidental falls suffered by susceptible individuals, such as the elderly (idiopathic) and people with neurological (Parkinson's, Multiple sclerosis, stroke survivors, Guillain-Barre, traumatic brain injury, incomplete spinal cord injury) or orthopedic (lower limb or spinal column fractures or arthritis, post-surgery, joint replacement, lower limb amputation, soft tissue injuries) indications. 

Current approaches to fall prevention are problematic because even though awareness is high among professionals that work with seniors and fall prevention activities are pervasive among community living establishments, fall death rates among older adults have more than doubled. The challenges are believed to be three-fold. First, insufficient evidence exists that any fall risk screening instrument is adequate for predicting falls. While the strongest predictors of fall risk tend to include a history of falls during the past year, gait, and balance abnormalities, existing models show a strong bias and therefore mostly fail to differentiate between adults that are at low risk and high risk of falling.

Second, current fall prevention interventions in the United States are limited between short-term individualized therapy provided by a high-cost physical therapist or longer-term wellness activity provided in a low-cost group setting. Neither arrangement is optimum in preventing falls over a large population, especially as these evidence-based physical exercise programs have limited effectiveness (approximately 25%). Even multifactorial interventions, which include extensive physical exercise, medication adjustment, and environmental modification only lower fall risk by 31% after 12 months. Questions around effectiveness of current approaches (physical exercise and multifactorial interventions) have been found in multiple settings, including long-term care facilities and hospitals.

The final challenge is adherence. Average adherence in group-based fall prevention exercise programs is around 66%, mostly due to the highly repetitive nature of the programs and the extremely long duration required for noticeable benefits accrue. Adherence to physical therapy can be even lower. When adherence is below 70%, effectiveness of fall prevention physical exercise programs can drop to less than 10%.

Practitioners are aware that the most successful approach to fall prevention utilizes a multimodal, motor-cognitive training approach that could be introduced to all adults over 65. The scientific basis of this approach is an understanding of how the dual-task paradigm induces neuroplasticity in the brain, especially in aging populations. This is driving a growing body of research that specifically links the cognitive sub-domains of attention and executive function (EF) to gait alterations and fall risk.

Cost of falls 
Falls and fall-related injuries are among the most common but serious medical problems experienced by older adults. Nearly one-third of older people fall each year, half of which fall more than once per year. Over 3 million Americans over the age of 65 visited hospital emergency departments in 2015 due to fall-related injuries, with over 1.6 million being admitted. Because of decreased bone density due to osteoporosis, mobility, and reflexes, falls often result in hip fractures and other fractures, head injuries, and death in older adults. Accidental injuries are the fifth most common cause of death in older adults. 75% of hip fracture patients do not recover completely and show signs of overall health deterioration.

Strategies and interventions 
Motor-cognitive training is increasingly viewed as the gold standard for healthy aging and fall prevention. One approach that has been researched is the introduction of semi-immersive virtual reality simulation during treadmill training. Initially conceptualized by the Tel Aviv Sourasky Medical Center with funding from the Michael J Fox Foundation and the European Commission, V-TIME projects a real-time image of participants' feet onto a large screen at eye-level while the participants are walking on a treadmill. The virtual environment introduces multiple physical and cognitive challenges while the participant is in dynamic motion. This one approach to motor-cognitive training was found to repeatedly reduce falls by 50% after 5 weeks of 15 sessions across multiple clinical trials and multiple indications (idiopathic, Parkinson's, Multiple sclerosis). The biological manifestations of this improvement were identified through functional MRI, which showed changes in brain activity patterns for patients that were exposed to combined motor-cognitive training, as opposed to exclusively physical training.

Other preventative measures with positive effects include strength and balance training, home risk assessment, the withdrawal of psychotropic medication, cardiac pacing for those with carotid sinus hypersensitivity, and tai chi. Resistance exercise two or three times a week with ankle weights or elastic bands has been proven in tests to rebuild lost muscle mass and reduce falls in adults of all ages: it was first tested in New Zealand by the Otago Medical School in four controlled trials, in which about 1,000 older adults with an average age 84 participated. Falls among a test group that did the Otago routines three times a week for 12 months was 35% fewer than a control group that did not use the routines. Two similar 12-month tests were conducted in the US using residents in assisted and skilled nursing facilities with one group showing a 54% reduction in falls. After the age of 50, adults experience a decrease in muscle mass (sarcopenia) by approximately 2% every year. A systematic review concluded that resistance training can slow down the rate of loss in muscle mass and strength. It has been recommended that older adults participate in resistance training two to three times a week to weaken the effects of sarcopenia. Assistive technology can also be applied, although it is mostly reactive in case of a fall. Exercise as a single intervention has been shown to prevent falls in community-dwelling older adults. A systematic review suggests that having an exercise regimen that includes challenging balance workouts for three or more hours per week results in a lesser chance of falling.  Resistance training has been shown to be beneficial beyond fall prevention, as it also helps improve functional mobility and activities of daily living such as walking endurance, gait speed, and stair climbing. Research explains that this significant increase in performance can be accomplished after the age of 90. For older adults to gain confidence in resistance training, which may ultimately lead to falling prevention effects, they must obtain the recommended amount of daily activity.

The aim of medical management is to identify factors that can contribute to falls and fracture risk such as osteoporosis, multiple medications, balance and gait problems, loss of vision and a history of falls. Beers Criteria is a list of medications that are potentially inappropriate for use in the elderly and some of them increase the risk of falls.

Falls are well known amongst community-dwelling individuals ages 65 and older. The risk of fall-related incidents nearly doubles when individuals are institutionalized. The impact on different falls in certain situation of fall prevention programs on the rate differences of falls in elderly population has not been reported. As well as cognitive impairment, functional impairment, gait, and balance disorders, certain medications can increase fall risk factors for patients. At an advanced age, these risk factors are double and more likely to occur. It's important to identify the risk factors that increase the likelihood of injurious falls. State-level fall prevention strategies can also mitigate fall risk for community-dwelling older adults.

Risk factors of falls

Older adults 
Studies have shown that adults over the age of 65 are more prone to falls than younger, healthy adults. Most falls in older adults are due to:
 Gait deviations – These are the main changes that occur in the gait patterns of older adults, which may contribute to the incidence of falls. Older adults may experience a 10–20% reduction in gait velocity and reduction in stride length, an increase in stance width and double support phase, or a bent posture. Studies show that a wider stride does not necessarily increase stability, and may instead increase the likelihood of experiencing falls.
Limitations in mobility – Loss of mobility increases the risk of falls in situations which, under normal circumstances, would pose a low risk of falling (such as walking up/down stairs).
Reduced muscle strength, especially in the lower body, which leads to difficulties standing up.
Poor reaction time – Aging is associated with the gradual slowing of an individual's reaction time.
 Accidents/environmental factors – Falls may occur due to dangerous or unstable surfaces, such as wet surfaces, ice, stairs, or rugs; or inappropriate footwear.
 Balance disorders – vertigo, syncope, unsteadiness, ataxias
 Visual, sensory, motor, and cognitive impairment
 Medications and alcohol consumption – Dizziness, drowsiness and confusion can occur as side effects of some medications. Alcohol consumption causes a delay in reflexes and diminishes balance and fine motor control via its inhibitory effects on nerve pathways in the cerebellum.
 Acute and chronic infections
 Dehydration

Stroke
Individuals who have had a stroke have higher fall rates. Approximately 30% fall at least once a year and 15% fall twice or more. Risk factors for falls in stroke survivors are:
 Gait deviations – Disturbance of gait is a common problem post-stroke and a common contributor of falls, predicting a continual functional decline.  Velocity, cadence, stride time, stride length, and temporal symmetry index are reduced and result in significant gait deterioration. Reduced propulsion at push-off, decreased leg flexion during the swing phase, reduced stability during the stance phase, and reduced automaticity of walking occur.
 Reduced muscle tone and weakness
 Side effects of drugs
 Hypoglycemia
 Hypotension
 Communication disorders
 Hemianopia
 Visuospatial agnosia

Parkinson's disease
Most people with Parkinson's disease (PD) fall and many experience recurrent falls. A study reported that over 50% of persons with PD fell recurrently. Direct and indirect causes of falls in patients with PD:
 Gait deviations – Decreased gait velocity and stride length due to hypokinetic movement, decreased cadence due to bradykinetic movements. Affected individuals also exhibit flat foot strike.
 Sudden falls
 Freezing and festination episodes
 Postural instability
 Intensified dyskinesia
 Autonomic system disorders – orthostatic hypotension, neurocardiogenic syncope, postural orthostatic tachycardia syndrome
 Neurological and sensory disturbances – muscle weakness of lower limbs, deep sensibility impairment, epileptic seizure, cognitive impairment, visual impairment, balance impairment
 Cardiovascular disease
 Drugs

Multiple sclerosis
There is a high prevalence of falls among persons with multiple sclerosis (MS), with approximately 50% reporting a fall within the past six months. About 30% of those individuals report falling multiple times. 
 Gait deviations – Gait variability is elevated in individuals with MS. Stride length, cadence, and velocity decrease, while stance duration and cycle duration increase.
 Foot drop
 Ataxia – vestibular ataxia results in loss of balance. Symptoms are exacerbated when the eyes are closed and the base of support is reduced.
 Reduced proprioception
 Improper or reduced use of assistive devices
 Vision – blurred vision, double vision, loss of peripheral vision
 Cognitive changes – Approximately 50% of affected individuals experience difficulty with their cognition over the course of the disease, which affects planning, organizing, problem-solving, and the ability to accurately perceive the environment. When these problems interfere with walking, it may result in a fall.
 Neurological medications – causes fatigue, weakness, dizziness

Dementia
Studies suggest that men are twice as likely to fall as women. Common causes of falls in dementia include:
 Gait deviations – Slower walking speed, reduced cadence, and step length, increased postural flexion, increased double support time
 Postural instability – Gait changes and impaired balance. People with balance deficits are at more risk of falling than those with a normal gait and intact balance.
 Lack of physical exercise
 Visual impairment - Blurry vision, low vision, and loss of peripheral vision. Eyesight cannot be fixed or corrected by glasses.
 Fatigue
 Medications – psychotropic drugs have effects on balance, reaction time and other sensorimotor functions, orthostatic hypotension, and extrapyramidal symptoms.

Fear of falling (basophobia) 

Basophobia is a term used in many circumstances to describe the fear of falling in either normal or special situations. It refers to uncomfortable sensations that may be experienced by older people. These sensations can include lower-body weakness or loss of balance, which can induce a frightening sensation of falling that can lead to serious and potentially fatal injuries.

Healthy young individuals
Accidents are the most common cause of falls involving healthy adults, which may be the result of tripping on stairs, improper footwear, dark surroundings, slippery surfaces, uneven ground, or lack of exercise. Studies suggest that women are more prone to falling than men in all age groups. The most common injuries among younger patients occur in the hands, wrists, knees, and ankles.

Environmental modification 

The home environment can present many hazards. Common places for injurious falls include the bathtub and stairs. Changes to the home environment are aimed at reducing hazards and help support a person in daily activities; they include minimizing clutter, installing grab bars in the bathroom, and installing non-slip decals to slippery surfaces. Stairs can be improved by installing handrails on both sides, improving lighting, and adding colour contrast between steps. Improvement in lighting and luminance levels can aid elderly people in assessing and negotiating hazards. Occupational therapists can help clients improve fall prevention behaviours. In addition, they can instruct clients and their family members on factors that contribute to falls, and implement environmental modifications and strategies to decrease the risk of falls. There is currently insufficient scientific evidence to ensure the effectiveness of modification of the home environment to reduce injuries. Evidence suggests that pre-discharge home assessments are associated with a reduced risk of falling.

Safety technology
Important improvements to prevent falls include handrails and grab bars, which should be easy to grip or grasp and should be near any stairs or change in floor level. Floors should always be flat and level, with no exposed corners or edges. Patterned floors can be dangerous if they create misleading or distorted images of the floor surface, and should be avoided.

There are special handles and closed handgrips available in bathrooms and lavatories to help users bend down or over. For example, extra support for users when moving include walking sticks, crutches, and support frames, such as a walker. Flexible handles such as hanging straps can also be useful supports.

Eyeglasses selection and usage 
Bifocal spectacles and trifocal eyeglasses are used to provide refractory correction ideal for reading (12–24 inches (30–60 cm) when the wearer looks downward through them. Reading glasses are not ideal for safe walking, where correction for 4.5–5 feet (137–152 cm) would be more appropriate.

Occupational and physical therapy 
Studies show that balance, flexibility, strength, and motor-cognitive training not only improve mobility but also reduce the risk of falling. This may be achieved through group and home-based exercise programs or engagement with physical therapy clinics with the appropriate equipment. The majority of older adults do not exercise regularly and 35% of people over the age of 65 do not participate in any leisurely physical activities.

Older adults
In older adults, physical training and perturbation therapy is directed to improving balance recovery responses and preventing falls. Gait-related changes in the elderly provide a greater chance of stability during walking due to slower speed and greater base of support, but they also increase the chance of slipping or tripping and falling. Appropriate joint moment generation is required to create sufficient push-off for balance recovery. Age-related changes in muscles, tendons, and neural structures may contribute to slower reactive responses. Interventions involving resistance training along with perturbation training may prove to be beneficial in improving muscle strength and balance recovery.

Stroke recovery
Stroke exercises help patients regain mobility and strength in their bodies, and must be done regularly in order to regain muscle tone that helps prevent falls.

Exercises for prevention 
One of the most important things for fall prevention in elderly populations is to stay physically fit. Specialized facilities and programs like seniors' parks are a good place to keep the elderly in shape and increase their resistance to falling. These facilities contain specialized equipment and training stations where elderly people can exercise. The parks usually have an extended amount of space and different stages reserved for different body exercises. Research suggests that participation in such programs successfully mitigates fall risk in the majority of attendees.

See also 
Morse Fall Scale
Falling (accident)
Falls in older adults
Fall Prevention Center of Excellence
Light ergonomics
Lighting for the elderly
Safety engineering
Safety equipment
Home modifications
Home automation for elderly and disabled people
Assisted living
Assistive technology

References

Further reading

External links 
 Fall prevention NHS Choices
 Fall prevention for older adults US Centers for Disease Control and Prevention
 Fall Prevention in the Workplace US Centers for Disease Control and Prevention, National Institute for Occupational Safety and Health

Geriatrics
Patient safety
Prevention